The Üsküdar Ferry Terminal, also known as the Üsküdar Pier, is a ferry terminal in Üsküdar, Istanbul, located along Paşa Limanı Avenue on the Bosporus strait. It is used by Municipal Şehir Hatları (City Lines) ferries as well as private Dentur ferries. Şehir Hatları ferries operate to several piers along the Bosporus and Golden Horn, while Dentur operates frequent ferry service to Kabataş and Beşiktaş.

The first Üsküdar Pier was built in 1852 and is notable as the first public ferry landing built on the Bosporus strait. The modern terminal was built in 1965. Üsküdar Terminal is located near Üsküdar Square in central Üsküdar, from which connections to bus, train and metro service are available. Another private ferry operator, Turyol, operates ferry service from its pier just north of Üsküdar terminal.

History
Üsküdar Pier was first opened in 1853 by an Ottoman ferry company, Şirket-i Hayriye as the companies first ferry pier on the Bosporus strait. The first pier was located slightly inland, near the Fountain of Ahmed III. The first ferry service from Üsküdar operated to Kabataş, on the European shore of the Bosporus. As Üsküdar grew in the late 19th century, ferry service also increased and the existing pier was not large enough to handle the capacity. In 1905, Şirket-i Hayriye began operating ferry service from Beşiktaş to Haydarpaşa station, via Üsküdar. In 1906, the first pier was demolished and replaced by a larger pier. The inside of the pier consisted of decorative tiles, with ticket counters and bird cages.

Şirket-i Hayriye was bought by the state-owned Şehir Hatları municipal ferry company in 1945. In the 1950s, the popularity of ferries grew along with passenger ridership. To increase capacity, a larger terminal was built in 1965 and remains in operation to this day.

Services
Üsküdar is a main pier for the municipal ferry service. Şehir Hatları operates ferries to 20 other piers on the Bosporus and Golden Horn, while Dentur operates to two other piers. Among these destinations are Beşiktaş, Kabataş, Eminönü, Karaköy and Kadıköy. Ferries leave Üsküdar at an average of 10 minute intervals, making it one of the busiest ferry terminals in Turkey.

References

Ferry piers in Istanbul
1853 establishments in the Ottoman Empire
Üsküdar